F6P may refer to:

 Fructose 6-phosphate
 Hexafluorophosphate